Auguste Hippolyte Collard (1812 – c. 1897) was an early French photographer. During the Second Empire he worked for the Ministry of Agriculture, Commerce and Public Works, documenting civil engineering projects in Paris and France, and worked with Édouard Baldus recording the expansion of the French railways.

References

External links
    
 Works by Collard in the J. Paul Getty Museum

19th-century French photographers
1812 births
1890s deaths